Pedram Sadeghian is an associate professor in the Civil Engineering Department at Dalhousie University in Halifax, Nova Scotia, Canada. He is also a Tier 2 Canada Research Chair in Sustainable Infrastructure.

Research 
Pedram research on the sustainable rehabilitation of existing infrastructure as well as the use of sustainable materials and practices in new infrastructure. They test the viability of advanced materials, such as fiber-reinforced polymers (FRPs), for use in structural applications through experimental testing and analysis.

Pedram has authored numerous journal papers on the use of FRPs for strengthening existing concrete columns, sandwich panel applications, and concrete reinforcement.

Selected publications
Experimental Study of Rectangular RC Columns Strengthened with CFRP Composites under Eccentric Loading, Journal of Composites for Construction 14 (4), 443–450, 2010
Long-term Tensile Properties of Natural Fibre-Reinforced Polymer Composites: Comparison of Flax and Glass Fibres, Composites Part B: Engineering 95, 82–95, 2016
Improved Design-Oriented Confinement Models for FRP-Wrapped Concrete Cylinders based on Statistical Analyses, Engineering Structures 87, 162–182, 2015
Experimental and Analytical Behavior of Sandwich Composite Beams: Comparison of Natural and Synthetic Materials, Journal of Sandwich Structures & Materials 20 (3), 287–307, 2018
Nonlinear Modeling of Ultimate Strength and Strain of FRP-Confined Concrete using Chaos Control Method, Composite Structures 163, 423–431, 2017
Numerical Modeling of Concrete Cylinders Confined with CFRP Composites, Journal of Reinforced Plastics and Composites 27 (12), 1309–1321, 2008
A Rational Approach toward Strain Efficiency Factor of Fiber-Reinforced Polymer-Wrapped Concrete Columns, ACI Structural Journal 111 (1), 135,2014
Experimental Behavior of Concrete Cylinders Confined with CFRP Composites, 14th World Conference on Earthquake Engineering, Beijing, China, 12–17 2008

References

External links 
 

Living people
Canada Research Chairs
Academic staff of the Dalhousie University
Year of birth missing (living people)